The 2008 Deutsche Tourenwagen Masters was the twenty-second season of premier German touring car championship and also ninth season under the moniker of Deutsche Tourenwagen Masters since the series' resumption in 2000. The series began on 13 April at the Hockenheimring and finished on 26 October at the same venue, after eleven rounds. Timo Scheider won the title, having never previously won a race before the start of the season.

Teams and drivers
The following manufacturers, teams and drivers competed in the 2008 Deutsche Tourenwagen Masters. All teams competed with tyres supplied by Dunlop.

Race calendar and winners

Season standings

Scoring system
Points are awarded to the top eight finishers.

Drivers' Standings

† — Driver retired, but was classified as they completed 90% of the winner's race distance.

Notes:
 In the ninth round of the championship in Catalunya Ekström originally crossed the line 5th and Green 8th. However, due to an overly harsh duel between the two on the last lap the stewards penalized both men. Ekström was disqualified and Green was given a 30 seconds’ time penalty. As Ekström already had caught the attention of the stewards in a negative way during the race, his penalty was bigger.

Teams' championship

External links
 The official website of the Deutsche Tourenwagen Masters

Deutsche Tourenwagen Masters seasons
Deutsche Tourenwagen Masters